Ramiz Mamedov (born 21 August 1972) is a retired Soviet and Russian football player of Azerbaijani descent, best known as a defender for Spartak Moscow in the 1990s.

Club career
Mamedov's career as player started in 1991 and finished in 2003, during this time he played for Spartak Moscow, Arsenal Tula, Krylia Sovetov, FC Dynamo Kyiv, SK Sturm Graz, Volgar-Gazprom and Luch-Energiya.

International career
As a member of the Russia national under-21 football team, Mamedov competed at the 1994 UEFA European Under-21 Football Championship in France. They were defeated in the quarter-final by the France.

On 17 August 1994, he was called up for the first time to the Russia national football team in a friendly against Austria.

Club statistics

Honours

Club
Spartak Moscow
Russian Premier League: 1992, 1993, 1994, 1996, 1997
Soviet Cup: 1991–92
Russian Cup: 1993–94, 1997–98
CIS Cup: 1993

Dynamo Kyiv
Ukrainian Premier League: 1999–00
Ukrainian Cup: 1999–00

Individual
Sport-Express'''s Best right defender of Russian Premier League: 1994, 1995 Mamedov became the first five-time champion of Russia Premier League (1992, 1993, 1994, 1996, 1997)
''Mamedov became the first player to become the champion of Russia and Ukraine, with teams of Spartak Moscow and Dynamo Kyiv.

References

External links
RussiaTeam biography and profile 
Video about career of Ramiz Mamedov
Biography at Krylia Sovetov's website 

1972 births
Living people
Soviet footballers
Russian footballers
Russian sportspeople of Azerbaijani descent
Russia international footballers
Russia under-21 international footballers
Russian expatriate footballers
Expatriate footballers in Ukraine
Russian expatriate sportspeople in Ukraine
Expatriate footballers in Austria
FC Spartak Moscow players
PFC Krylia Sovetov Samara players
FC Dynamo Kyiv players
SK Sturm Graz players
FC Luch Vladivostok players
FC Volgar Astrakhan players
Russian Premier League players
Ukrainian Premier League players
Austrian Football Bundesliga players
FC Arsenal Tula players
FC Lokomotiv Moscow players
Association football defenders
FC Sokol Saratov players